Zafar Hashemi (born February 17, 1985) is Afghan-American who serves as special advisor on Afghanistan for the Special Inspector General for Afghanistan Reconstruction (SIGAR). Previously, he worked as the political counselor at the embassy of Afghanistan in Washington, D.C. He was also the deputy (and for nine months acting) spokesperson of the President of Afghanistan, Ashraf Ghani until January 2017.

Life & Career
An ethnic Tajik, Hashemi fled Afghanistan as a child to Pakistan during the Taliban regime. He later resided in the U.S. to study, achieving a bachelor's degree in political science at the University of Maryland and a master's degree in public administration at Johns Hopkins University. Before immigrating to the United States in 2007, Hashemi managed communication and public affairs of Afghanistan Stabilization Program (ASP) under the Interior Ministry, and prior to that he was a journalist and a radio presenter for Nawa 103.1 FM in 2007, and later at AWAZ. He later became a television presenter and journalist at Voice of America (VOA) in Washington DC.

References

Living people
Afghan politicians
1985 births
Voice of America people
University System of Maryland alumni
Johns Hopkins University alumni